Henry Petersen From (1 June 1926 – 31 August 1990) was a Danish association football goalkeeper. He played 31 games for the Denmark national football team, and won a silver medal at the 1960 Summer Olympics. He spent his entire club career at AGF Aarhus, with whom he won four Danish football championships and four Danish Cups.

Biography
Born in Aarhus, From started playing football with Aarhus Gymnastik Forening (AGF). He was a reserve goalkeeper at the 1952 Summer Olympics, but did not play there. From was a stalwart goalkeeper in the AGF team which won the Danish championship three years in a row, from 1955 to 1957, as well as the 1955 and 1957 Danish Cup trophies. He made his Danish national team debut in May 1957, and quickly established himself as Denmark's leading goalkeeper.

From was the starting goalkeeper as Denmark won silver medals at the 1960 Olympic football tournament. In the semi-finals against Hungary, Denmark were leading 1–0 when Hungary were awarded a penalty kick. As he readied himself for the penalty kick, From spat his chewing gum out, and stuck it to the goalpost. He saved Hungarian player Pal Varhidi's shot, took the chewing gum in his mouth again, and Denmark went on to win the game 2–0.

From won a third Danish championship with AGF in 1960, as well as two further Danish Cup trophies in 1960 and 1961. On the international stage, he helped AGF reach the quarter-finals of the 1961 European Cup, where they were defeated by S.L. Benfica from Portugal. He played his last Danish national team game in May 1961, before ending his national team career after 31 games.

From 1968 to 1969, From was the Danish national team coach in 20 games. He collaborated with Erik Hansen, and later John Hansen. From was the coach, while the two others took turns in functioning as Danish team managers.

Bibliography
"From klarer", memoirs (1961)

References

External links

Danish national team profile
 DBUs landstrænere i perioden 1967–69  at the Danish Football Association

1926 births
1990 deaths
Danish men's footballers
Denmark international footballers
Danish football managers
Footballers at the 1952 Summer Olympics
Footballers at the 1960 Summer Olympics
Olympic footballers of Denmark
Olympic silver medalists for Denmark
Aarhus Gymnastikforening players
Aarhus Gymnastikforening managers
Denmark national football team managers
Olympic medalists in football
Footballers from Aarhus
Medalists at the 1960 Summer Olympics
Burials at Vestre Cemetery, Aarhus
Association football goalkeepers